Aardvark AMCS Mk4 is a British-made Mine flail vehicle built by Aardvark Clear Mine Ltd of Dumfries, Scotland.

The AMCS flail system was developed in Aberdeenshire by David Macwatt of Elgin, Scotland and George Sellar & Son of Huntly (system designers were James (Barney) Hepburn, Pat McRobbie and Alistair Birnie) with the cooperation of Ford Motor Co, Basildon. George Sellar & Son owned a number of patents concerning the rotor and chain design and electronic depth contouring system and manufactured the flail assembly. The armoured vehicle was manufactured by Glover & Webb of Southampton until their acquisition by GKN who continued to armour vehicles for a period before Penman Engineering were given the contract.

Aardvark Clear Mine Ltd was acquired in 2016 from Penman Engineering Ltd of Dumfries, and is now owned by its shareholders.

Aardvark's Global business is managed from the UK with operational and training facilities in Dumfries in the Scottish Borders and Insch in Aberdeenshire. The company also has offices in Washington, USA and Riyadh, in the Kingdom of Saudi Arabia.

Aardvark clearance machines have been used by the military, the UN, NGO's and other charitable organisations for humanitarian mine clearance operations in Europe, Africa and in the Middle and Far East. Aardvarks have also been chosen by the British and American forces for
landmine clearance in Afghanistan and Iraq.

Design
The vehicle consists of an armoured cab with a front-mounted flail system. The system has 72 chains with 66 striker tips.

 Armour: 56 mm armoured glass windows, double-skin cab floor
 Crew: 2 - 1 operator, 1 crew member
 Powertrain: 160 hp 6-cylinder turbo charged New Holland diesel engine
 Transmission: 4-speed synchromesh; 4 gears, 16-speed
 Flail System: 72 chains, 66 tips

Users

Users of the AARDVARK JSFU system:
  - (Pakistan Army)
  - (Canadian Army) - deployed in Afghanistan
  - (French Army)
  - (Botswana Ground Force)
  - (Indonesian Army)
  - (Irish Army)
  - (Royal Jordanian Land Force)
  - (Latvian Special Forces)
  - (Royal Netherlands Army)
  - (Royal Saudi Land Force)
  - (Singapore Army)
  - (Republic of Korea Army)
  Syrian opposition
  - (United States Army)
  - (British Army)

See also
 Mine plow
 Mine roller
 Sisu RA-140 DS

Notes

References

Military engineering vehicles of the United Kingdom
Mine warfare countermeasures